The molecular formula C22H26O7 (molar mass: 402.44 g/mol, exact mass: 402.16785312 u) may refer to:

 Gmelinol, a lignan
 Habenariol, a phenolic compound found in orchids
 L-165041, a PPARδ receptor agonist

Molecular formulas